Conan Christopher O'Brien (born April 18, 1963) is an American television host, comedian, writer, and producer. O'Brien is best known for having hosted late-night talk shows for almost 28 years, beginning with Late Night with Conan O'Brien (1993–2009) and The Tonight Show with Conan O'Brien (2009–2010) on the NBC television network, and Conan (2010–2021) on the cable channel TBS. Before his hosting career, he was a writer for the NBC sketch comedy series Saturday Night Live from 1988 to 1991, and the Fox animated sitcom The Simpsons from 1991 to 1993. He has also been host of the podcast series Conan O'Brien Needs a Friend since 2018 and is expected to launch a new show on HBO Max.

Born in Brookline, Massachusetts, O'Brien was raised in an Irish Catholic family. He served as president of The Harvard Lampoon while attending Harvard University, and was a writer for the sketch comedy series Not Necessarily the News. After writing for several comedy shows in Los Angeles, he joined the writing staff of Saturday Night Live. O'Brien was a writer and producer for The Simpsons for two seasons until he was selected by Lorne Michaels and NBC to take over David Letterman's position as host of Late Night in 1993. A virtual unknown to the public, O'Brien's initial Late Night tenure received unfavorable reviews and remained on a multiweek renewal cycle during its early years. The show generally improved over time and was highly regarded by the time of his departure in 2009. Afterwards, O'Brien moved from New York to Los Angeles to host his own incarnation of The Tonight Show for seven months until highly-publicized network politics prompted a host change in 2010. After this departure, O'Brien hosted a 32-city live comedy tour titled The Legally Prohibited from Being Funny on Television Tour, which was the subject of the documentary Conan O'Brien Can't Stop. He then hosted Conan from 2010 to 2021. Throughout his career he has also hosted a number of awards shows and television specials, including the Emmy Awards and the White House Correspondents' dinner twice each.

Known for his spontaneous hosting style, which has been characterized by The New York Times as "awkward, self-deprecating humor", O'Brien's late-night programs combine the "lewd and wacky with more elegant, narrative-driven short films". His segments outside the studio, dubbed "remotes", have also become some of his best-received work, including the international travel series Conan Without Borders. With the retirement of David Letterman on May 20, 2015, O'Brien became the longest-working late-night talk show host active in the United States. This active streak ended with O'Brien's retirement from late-night television in June 2021, with his entire run as a late-night host lasting almost 28 years. Conan was named one of Times 100 Most Influential People in 2010.

Early life 
O'Brien was born on April 18, 1963, in Brookline, Massachusetts. His father, Thomas Francis O'Brien (b. 1929), is a physician and professor of medicine at Harvard Medical School where he specializes in epidemiology. His mother, Ruth O'Brien (née Reardon; b. 1931), is a retired attorney and former partner at the Boston firm Ropes & Gray. O'Brien has three brothers and two sisters. O'Brien attended Brookline High School, where he served as the managing editor of the school newspaper, then called The Sagamore. He was a congressional intern for Congressman Barney Frank and in his senior year, he won the National Council of Teachers of English writing contest with his short story "To Bury the Living".

After graduating as valedictorian in 1981, O'Brien entered Harvard University. He lived in Holworthy Hall during his first year with future businessman Luis Ubiñas and two other roommates, and in Mather House during his three upper-class years. He majored in History & Literature, and graduated magna cum laude with a Bachelor of Arts degree in 1985. O'Brien's senior thesis, entitled Literary Progeria in the Works of William Faulkner and Flannery O'Connor, concerned the use of children as symbols in the works of William Faulkner and Flannery O'Connor. During college, O'Brien briefly played drums in a band called the Bad Clams and was a writer for the Harvard Lampoon humor magazine. During his sophomore and junior years, he served as the Lampoons president. At this time, O'Brien's future boss at NBC, Jeff Zucker, was serving as president of the school newspaper The Harvard Crimson.

 Career 
 Saturday Night Live (1988–1991) 

After graduating from Harvard, O'Brien moved to Los Angeles to join the writing staff of HBO's sketch comedy series Not Necessarily the News. He was also a writer on the short-lived The Wilton North Report. He spent two years with that show and performed regularly with improvisational groups, including The Groundlings. In January 1988, Saturday Night Live (SNL) executive producer Lorne Michaels hired O'Brien as a writer. During his three years on SNL, he wrote such recurring sketches as "Mr. Short-Term memory" and "The Girl Watchers"; the latter was first performed by Tom Hanks and Jon Lovitz.

While on a writers' strike from Saturday Night Live following the 1987–88 season, O'Brien put on an improvisational comedy revue in Chicago with fellow SNL writers Bob Odenkirk and Robert Smigel called Happy Happy Good Show. While living in Chicago, O'Brien briefly shared an apartment with Jeff Garlin near Wrigley Field. In 1989, O'Brien and his fellow SNL writers received an Emmy Award for Outstanding Writing for a Variety Series.

O'Brien, like many SNL writers, occasionally appeared as an extra in sketches; his most notable appearance was as a doorman in a sketch in which Tom Hanks was inducted into the SNL "Five-Timers Club" for hosting his fifth episode in 1990. O'Brien and Robert Smigel wrote the television pilot for Lookwell starring Adam West, which aired on NBC in 1991. Despite the support from NBC president Brandon Tartikoff, the pilot never went to series. Despite the negative reviews, it became a cult hit. It was later screened at The Other Network, a festival of unaired TV pilots produced by Un-Cabaret; it featured an extended interview with O'Brien and was rerun in 2002 on the Trio network.

In 1991, O'Brien quit Saturday Night Live, citing burnout and his recent engagement to be married. "I told Lorne Michaels I couldn't come back to work and I just needed to do something else," O'Brien recalled. "I had no plan whatsoever. I was literally in this big transition phase in my life where I decided, I'll just walk around New York City, and an idea will come to me." After leaving the show, O'Brien returned to host the show in 2001 during its 26th season. He returned to Saturday Night Live on the February 26, 2022 episode as a guest during a Five-Timers Club skit.

 The Simpsons (1991–1993) 

Mike Reiss and Al Jean, then showrunners of the animated sitcom The Simpsons, called O'Brien and offered him a job. The series was prestigious in the writing community at the time; O'Brien recalls "everyone wanted to be on that show, but they never hired." O'Brien was one of the first hires after the show's original crew. With the help of an old Groundlings friend, actor Lisa Kudrow, O'Brien purchased an apartment in Beverly Hills. He and Kudrow became involved as well, and Kudrow believed he should begin performing rather than writing. O'Brien disagreed, feeling that Kudrow was flattering him, and asserting he was happy as a writer. In his speech given at Class Day at Harvard in 2000, O'Brien credited The Simpsons with saving him, a reference to the career slump he was experiencing before being hired for the show.

From 1991 to 1993, O'Brien was a writer and producer for The Simpsons. When O'Brien first arrived at the Fox lot, they temporarily gave him writer Jeff Martin's office. O'Brien was nervous and self-conscious, feeling that he would embarrass himself in front of what he regarded as an intimidating collection of writers. O'Brien would pitch characters in their voices, as he thought that was the norm, until Reiss informed him that no one did this. He fit in quickly, commanding control of the room frequently; writer Josh Weinstein called it a "ten-hour Conan show, nonstop". According to John Ortved, one of his fellow writers said that Conan had been a shoo-in to take over as showrunner.

O'Brien wrote some of the series' most acclaimed episodes: "Marge vs. the Monorail" and "Homer Goes to College". The show was initially a highly realistic family sitcom; after O'Brien's debut, the show took a rapid shift in the direction of the surreal. O'Brien also has sole writing credits on "New Kid on the Block" and "Treehouse of Horror IV", on which he wrote the episode wraparounds. Wallace Wolodarsky described a "room character" Conan put on for the writers: "Conan used to do this thing called the Nervous Writer that involved him opening a can of Diet Coke and then nervously pitching a joke. He would spray Diet Coke all over himself, and that was always a source of endless amusement among us." During his time at The Simpsons, O'Brien also had a side project working with Smigel on the script for a musical film based on the "Hans and Franz" sketch from Saturday Night Live, but the film was never produced.Interview with Kevin Nealon. Conan. December 2, 2010.

Meanwhile, David Letterman was preparing to leave the talk show Late Night, prompting executive producer Lorne Michaels to search for a new host. Michaels approached O'Brien to produce; then-agent Gavin Polone stressed that O'Brien wanted to perform, rather than produce. He arranged with Michaels that O'Brien would do a test audition on the stage of The Tonight Show. Jason Alexander and Mimi Rogers were the guests, and the audience was composed of Simpsons writers. Wolodarksky recalled the experience: "Seeing this friend of yours, this guy that you worked with, walk out from behind that curtain and deliver a monologue was like something you could only dream up that you couldn't ever imagine actually happening." The performance was beamed by satellite to New York, where Lorne Michaels and NBC executives watched. The audition was not well received by media commentators, citing his "awkward" humor.

O'Brien was picked as the new host of Late Night on April 26, 1993. During pre-production, writer Robert Smigel suggested fellow writer Andy Richter to sit beside O'Brien and act as a sidekick. As the writers headed to the voice record for "Homer Goes to College", O'Brien received a phone call from Polone informing him of the decision. "He was passed out facedown into this horrible shag carpet. He was just quiet and comatose down there on that carpet," recalled postproduction supervisor Michael Mendel. "I remember looking at him and saying, 'Wow. Your life is about to change, in a really dramatic way.'" Fox, however, would not let O'Brien out of his contract. Eventually, NBC and O'Brien split the cost to get him out of the contract.Jean, Al. (2004). Commentary for "Cape Feare", in The Simpsons: The Complete Fifth Season [DVD]. 20th Century Fox. After O'Brien's departure, the writers at The Simpsons would watch videotaped episodes of Late Night at lunch the day following their midnight broadcast and analyze them.

 Late Night (1993–2009) 

Late Night with Conan O'Brien, originating from Studio 6A at 30 Rockefeller Plaza in New York City, premiered on September 13, 1993, to unfavorable reviews from contemporary critics. This reception was not completely unsurprising; O'Brien wrote a self-deprecating The New York Times piece titled "O'Brien Flops!" on the day of the show's premiere. Critics attacked O'Brien: Tom Shales of The Washington Post suggested that "the host resume his previous identity, Conan O'Blivion." Generally, critics viewed O'Brien as nervous and fidgety on-camera, and that he was "too smart, too East Coast, too sophisticated, too young and even too tall to be successful." The show was constantly at risk for cancellation; at one low point in 1994, NBC threatened to put him on a week-to-week contract. Executives were anxious to replace him with Greg Kinnear, who followed O'Brien with Later at 1:30 am. Interns filled empty seats in the audience while affiliates began to inquire about replacement hosts. In one installment after a short stretch of reruns, sidekick Andy Richter described his vacation activities as follows: "I sat back and reminded myself what it's like to be unemployed." The in-joke alluded to the rumors floating in the trades that NBC was near canceling the program.

Late Night under O'Brien slowly but steadily acquired commercial and critical success. Banter between O'Brien and Richter improved, and sketches grew in popularity ("If They Mated", "Desk Drive", "In the Year 2000"). A reliable staple involved a TV screen, lowered behind O'Brien's desk and displaying a still photo of a news figure. The lips and voice of these characters – frequently a party-crazed hillbilly interpretation of Bill Clinton – were supplied by writing partner Robert Smigel. A turning point was David Letterman's February 1994 appearance. "It was a morale boost," said O'Brien. "I'm thinking, If the guy who created the 12:30 thing comes on and says we're smart and funny, let's go." The show went through a wobble in January 1995 when Robert Smigel, feeling burned out, quit as head writer. The show's quality improved slowly over time, and most credit O'Brien's growing comedic performance. Within a year, a comedic formula began to arise: the show would combine the lewd and wacky with a more elegant, narrative-driven remotes. Aside from the studio sketches, the show featured segments that occurred in the field, called remotes. One famous remote was when Conan visited a historic, Civil War-era baseball league. That piece was one of O'Brien's personal favorites, later remarking, "When I leave this earth, at the funeral, just show this, because this pretty much says who I'm all about."

O'Brien's audience, largely young and male (a coveted demographic), grew steadily and the show began to best competitors in the ratings, and continued to do so for 15 seasons. In the early days of the Internet, fans launched unofficial websites, compiling precise summaries of each episode. Even Tom Shales was a convert: he called the show "one of the most amazing transformations in television history." Beginning in 1996, O'Brien and the Late Night writing team were nominated annually for the Emmy Award for Best Writing in a Comedy or Variety Series, winning the award for the first and only time in 2007. In 1997, 2000, 2002, 2003, and 2004, he and the Late Night writing staff won the Writers Guild Award for Best Writing in a Comedy/Variety Series. In 2001, he formed his own television production company, Conaco, which subsequently shared in the production credits for Late Night.

, Late Night with Conan O'Brien had for eleven years consistently attracted an audience averaging about 2.5 million viewers. The apotheosis of the Late Night remotes centered on the realization, in 2006, that O'Brien bore a striking resemblance to Tarja Halonen, entering her second term as president of Finland. Capitalizing on the resemblance and on the 2006 Finnish presidential election, O'Brien and Late Night aired mock political ads both in support of Halonen and against her main opponent Sauli Niinistö, which influenced popular perception of the race, which Halonen eventually won. O'Brien traveled to Finland shortly after the election. "We took the show to Helsinki for five days," O'Brien recalled, "where we were embraced like a national treasure." As part of the five-day trip, which was released as a one-hour special episode of Late Night, O'Brien met with Halonen at the Finnish Presidential Palace.

During the writers' strike in 2008, O'Brien staged a mock feud with Comedy Central's Jon Stewart (of The Daily Show) and Stephen Colbert (of The Colbert Report) over a dispute about which of the three were responsible for giving a "bump" to Mike Huckabee's campaign to become the Republican presidential nominee. This feud crossed over all three shows during the 2007–08 Writers Guild of America strike.

On February 20, 2009, NBC aired the last episode of Late Night with Conan O'Brien. The show consisted of a compilation of previous Late Night clips and included a surprise appearance by former sidekick Andy Richter. Will Ferrell, John Mayer, and the White Stripes also appeared. O'Brien ended the episode by destroying the set with an axe, handing out the pieces of the set to the audience, and thanking a list of people who helped him. Among those thanked were Lorne Michaels, David Letterman, Jay Leno, and O'Brien's wife and children.

In 2019, clips from O'Brien's time on Late Night began to be posted on his TBS website and on the Team Coco YouTube channel.

 The Tonight Show (2009–2010) 

As part of a new contract negotiated with NBC in 2004, the network decided that O'Brien would take over The Tonight Show from Jay Leno in 2009. Leno then moved to a prime time slot, named The Jay Leno Show. Hosting The Tonight Show was a lifelong dream of O'Brien's, and the promise of succeeding Leno kept him in NBC's employ despite the fact that he likely could have secured a more lucrative deal at another network. O'Brien was a guest on Jay Leno's final episode of The Tonight Show. On June 1, 2009, Will Ferrell became Conan's first Tonight Show guest on the couch and Pearl Jam appeared as his first musical guest.

Conan acquired the nickname "Coco'''" after its use in the first "Twitter Tracker" sketch during the second episode of his Tonight Show run. Guest Tom Hanks used the nickname during his subsequent interview, even getting the audience to chant it. In reaction to the moniker, Conan remarked to Hanks in jest, "If that catches on, I'll sue you." During the taping of the Friday, September 25, 2009, episode of The Tonight Show, O'Brien suffered a mild concussion after he slipped and hit his head while running a race as part of a comedy sketch with guest Teri Hatcher. He was examined at a hospital and released the same day. A rerun was aired that night, but O'Brien returned to work the following Monday and poked fun at the incident.

By November 2009, ratings for O'Brien's The Tonight Show declined by around 2 million viewers since the previous year when Leno was host. On January 7, 2010, NBC executive Jeff Zucker met with Jay Leno and Conan O'Brien to discuss how to move Leno out of prime time, where his ratings were lackluster, and back into late night. It was proposed that O'Brien would remain as host of The Tonight Show, which would run at 12:05 am with Leno hosting a 30-minute show at 11:35 pm. Three days later, NBC Universal Television Entertainment chairman Jeff Gaspin confirmed that The Jay Leno Show would be moved to 11:35 pm following NBC's coverage of the 2010 Winter Olympics.

Sources familiar with the situation stated that O'Brien was unhappy and disappointed with NBC's plan. On January 12, O'Brien released this statement: "I sincerely believe that delaying The Tonight Show into the next day to accommodate another comedy program will seriously damage what I consider to be the greatest franchise in the history of broadcasting. The Tonight Show at 12:05 simply isn't The Tonight Show." On January 21, 2010, it was announced that Conan had reached a deal with NBC that would see him exit The Tonight Show the next day. The deal also granted him $45 million, of which $12 million was designated for distribution to his staff, who had moved with Conan to Los Angeles from New York when he left Late Night.

The final Tonight Show with Conan aired January 22, 2010, and featured guests Tom Hanks, Steve Carell (who did an exit interview and shredded Conan's ID badge), Neil Young (singing "Long May You Run"), and Will Ferrell. For Ferrell's appearance, Conan played guitar with the band and Ferrell sang "Free Bird" while reprising his SNL cowbell. Ferrell's wife, Viveca Paulin, together with Ben Harper, Beck, and ZZ Top guitarist Billy Gibbons, also joined the band for this final performance.Conan O'Brien Thanks Fans in "Tonight" Farewell, The New York Times, January 23, 2010

Jay Leno returned to The Tonight Show following NBC's coverage of the 2010 Winter Olympic Games. Under the $45 million deal with NBC, Conan was allowed to start working for another network as soon as September 2010. Conan's rumored next networks ranged from Fox to Comedy Central. Other networks reportedly interested in O'Brien included TNT, HBO, FX, Showtime, Revision3, and even the NBC Universal–owned USA Network.

 Television hiatus and comedy tour (2010) 

On February 8, 2010, it was reported that O'Brien was attempting to sell his Central Park West penthouse in New York with an asking price of $35 million. He had purchased the apartment in 2007 for $10 million. Two years earlier, O'Brien had purchased a home in the Brentwood section of Los Angeles for over $10.5 million. Some industry insiders have speculated that O'Brien had chosen to stay on the west coast in order to facilitate a return to late night television and because he did not want to put his children through another move.

O'Brien was included in the 2010 Time 100, a list compiled by Time of the 100 most influential people in the world as voted on by readers. After being prohibited from making television appearances of any kind until May, O'Brien spoke about the Tonight Show conflict on the CBS newsmagazine 60 Minutes on May 2, 2010. During the interview with Steve Kroft, O'Brien said the situation felt "like a marriage breaking up suddenly, violently, quickly. And I was just trying to figure out what happened." He also said he "absolutely" expected NBC to give him more of a chance and that, if in Jay Leno's position, he would not have come back to The Tonight Show. However, Conan said he did not feel unfortunate. "It's crucial to me that anyone seeing this, if they take anything away from this, it's I'm fine. I'm doing great," said O'Brien. "I hope people still find me comedically absurd and ridiculous. And I don't regret anything."

On March 11, 2010, O'Brien announced via his Twitter account that he would embark on a 30-city live tour beginning April 12, 2010, entitled, "The Legally Prohibited from Being Funny on Television Tour". Co-host Andy Richter, along with members of the former Tonight Show Band, joined O'Brien on the tour. Max Weinberg, however, was not able to join, except for a guest appearance at one of Conan's New York City shows. On April 12, 2010, O'Brien opened his two-month comedy tour in Eugene, Oregon, with a crowd of 2,500 and no TV cameras. The tour traveled through America's Northwest and Canada before moving on to larger cities, including Los Angeles and New York City, where he performed at Radio City Music Hall, next to his former Late Night studios. The tour ended in Atlanta on June 14. In 2011, the documentary film titled Conan O'Brien Can't Stop was released which followed O'Brien throughout his comedy tour. The film premiered March 2011 at the South by Southwest media festival to positive reviews. It was directed by Rodman Flender who is O'Brien's personal friend and classmate at Harvard University.

 Conan (2010–2021) 

The day his live tour began, O'Brien announced that he would host a new show on cable station TBS. The show, Conan, debuted on November 8, 2010 and aired Monday through Thursday at 11:00 pm ET/10:00 pm CT. O'Brien's addition moved Lopez Tonight with George Lopez back one hour. Refusing at first to do to Lopez what had happened to him at NBC, O'Brien agreed to join the network after Lopez called to persuade him to come to TBS.

In February 2015, following the onset of the Cuban thaw, O'Brien became the first American television personality to film in Cuba for more than half a century. O'Brien then visited Armenia for his next show abroad, during which he featured his assistant Sona Movsesian, who is Armenian American. While visiting, Conan guest-starred as a gangster on an Armenian soap opera. In April 2016, O'Brien visited South Korea in response to a fan letter urging him to visit, as well as a growing fan base online. His visit included a trip to the Korean Demilitarized Zone, which resulted in O'Brien and Steven Yeun also visiting North Korea on a technicality by stepping across the border line at the DMZ. Conan commented on the significance during the sketch, claiming, "The idea that you and I could be in North Korea, talking and communicating freely, seems like kind of a cool message." These remotes were later branded Conan Without Borders and became part of their own series, with O'Brien eventually traveling to thirteen countries in total. The series became some of his most popular work, winning an Emmy in 2018. The international shows became available on Netflix before moving to HBO Max.

TBS extended the show through 2018 in 2014 and through 2022 in 2017. In late 2018, Conan took a three-month hiatus while O'Brien launched another national comedy tour. The show returned January 22, 2019, in a new half-hour format without the live band.

In response to the impact of the COVID-19 pandemic, the program switched to a remotely-produced format from O'Brien's home beginning March 30, 2020. In July 2020, it was announced that Conan would continue with this format, but would be filmed with limited on-site staff from the Largo at the Coronet in Los Angeles and no studio audience — making it the first American late-night talk show to return to filming outside of the host's residence (albeit still not from its main studio). In November 2020, TBS announced that Conan would end in June 2021. The final show aired on June 24, 2021, featuring a live audience and marking the end of O'Brien's twenty-eight year run as a late-night host. It was announced that O'Brien will move to a weekly untitled variety show on fellow WarnerMedia property HBO Max, where he is expected to focus more on his podcast and travel shows with a relaxed production schedule. On his final show, O'Brien featured fictional character Homer Simpson, marking also the three episodes that O'Brien wrote for the series. Comedians Will Ferrell and Jack Black also paid their farewell to the show in the series finale.

 Conan O'Brien Needs a Friend and digital media (2018–present) 

In 2018, O'Brien's production company, Team Coco, partnered with Earwolf to launch his own weekly podcast, Conan O'Brien Needs a Friend. The podcast debuted November 18, 2018, with Will Ferrell as the first guest. O'Brien stated the title is tongue-in-cheek, saying he would like to see if celebrity guests would actually be his friends. In each episode, Conan is joined by his guest, as well as his assistant Sona Movsesian and the show's producer Matt Gourley. Guests on the podcast have included Barack and Michelle Obama, Stephen Colbert, and Bob Newhart among others. The podcast has received strong reviews and became the top podcast on iTunes. The podcast has also won numerous awards throughout its run. Deadline Hollywood reported that, as of August 2021, the podcast had been downloaded over 250 million times and was averaging more than 9 million downloads per month.

In May 2022, the podcast, as well as the entire Team Coco digital media business, was sold to SiriusXM for $150 million. This sale included all other Team Coco podcasts including Inside Conan and Parks and Recollection, as well as the development of a comedy channel for SiriusXM radio service.

Other work
 Television producer 

O'Brien was executive producer and co-wrote the pilot of the 2007 NBC adventure/comedy series Andy Barker, P.I., starring O'Brien's sidekick Andy Richter. After six episodes and low ratings, the show was canceled despite being named one of the Top Ten Shows of 2007 by Entertainment Weekly. Later, USA Network ordered a pilot episode of the medical-themed Operating Instructions, which was produced by O'Brien's production company Conaco. In January 2010 NBC ordered two pilots from Conaco, the one-hour courtroom drama Outlaw and a half-hour comedy. Outlaw was produced in eight episodes and premiered on September 15, 2010.

 Voice work 
O'Brien's first guest appearance after beginning his late-night career was playing himself in the season five Simpsons episode "Bart Gets Famous", interviewing Bart Simpson during his rise to fame as a catchphrase comedian. In 1999, O'Brien made an appearance on Futurama in the second-season episode "Xmas Story". O'Brien played himself as a head in a jar and still alive in the year 3000. O'Brien has made multiple voice appearances on the Adult Swim series Robot Chicken, including the specials Robot Chicken: Star Wars and Robot Chicken: Star Wars Episode II.

Other voice work performed by O'Brien has included the voice of Robert Todd Lincoln in the audiobook version of Assassination Vacation by Sarah Vowell, the voice of talk show host Dave Endochrine in the 2013 DC Universe Animated Original Movie Batman: The Dark Knight Returns (Part 2), the voice of the character Kuchikukan in the "Operation: Lunacorn Apocalypse" episode of Nickelodeon's The Penguins of Madagascar, and the voice of Santa Claus in The Backyardigans episode "The Action Elves Save Christmas Eve".

 Guest appearances 

On the TV show 30 Rock, O'Brien is depicted as an ex-boyfriend of lead character Liz Lemon, who works in the same building. In the episode "Tracy Does Conan", Conan appears as himself, awkwardly reunited with Lemon and coerced by network executive Jack Donaghy into having the character Tracy Jordan on Late Night, despite having been assaulted in Jordan's previous appearance. O'Brien also made a cameo appearance on the U.S. version of The Office. In the episode "Valentine's Day", Michael believes that he spots former SNL cast member, Tina Fey, but has actually mistaken another woman for her. In the meantime, Conan has a quick walk-on, and the camera crew informs Michael when he returns from talking to the Tina Fey lookalike. In 2011, he starred as himself in the web series Web Therapy (opposite Lisa Kudrow) for three episodes. O'Brien also made a guest appearance as the "Wandering MC" in the 2019 video game Death Stranding, where he communicates with the player using voice lines and facial expressions recorded during his visit to Kojima Productions' headquarters.

 Hosting duties 
O'Brien has hosted several awards shows and television specials. O'Brien hosted the 54th Primetime Emmy Awards in 2002 and the 58th Primetime Emmy Awards in 2006, to critical acclaim. O'Brien also hosted the 2014 MTV Movie Awards. In 2011 and 2012, O'Brien hosted the Christmas in Washington special for TBS' sister network, TNT, featuring celebrity performances and a special appearance by the Obama family both years.

Conan has served as the master of ceremonies for the White House Correspondents' Association dinner in Washington, D.C. twice, in 1995 and 2013. In 2016, O'Brien hosted the 5th Annual NFL Honors in San Francisco, California. He also hosted a reunion special in Northern Ireland for Game of Thrones in 2018 for the final season of the series. The special was released on HBO Max in 2021.

 Influences and style 
O'Brien lists among his comedic influences David Letterman, Peter Sellers, Sid Caesar, Warner Bros. Cartoons, Johnny Carson, Ernie Kovacs, Bob Hope, and Woody Allen. In turn, actors and comedians who claim O'Brien as an influence include Mindy Kaling, Pete Holmes, Seth Meyers, Nikki Glaser, John Krasinski, Moses Storm, Sam Richardson, Colin Jost, Kumail Nanjiani, Ron Funches, John Mulaney, and Eric André. The military working dog Conan is reportedly named after O'Brien according to Newsweek.

On Late Night, O'Brien became known for his active and spontaneous hosting style, which has been characterized as "self-deprecating" by both media outlets and O'Brien himself. This spontaneity is also apparent in remotes in which he is put in novel and open-ended environments. Some of these, such as a "Civil War-era baseball" remote during Late Night and his international Conan Without Borders shows, are among his best-received work.

 Personal life 

O'Brien met Elizabeth Ann "Liza" Powel in 2000, when she appeared on Late Night with Conan O'Brien in an advertising skit involving Hilton Furniture and Foote, Cone & Belding, where she worked as senior copywriter. The couple dated for nearly 18 months before their 2002 marriage in Powel's hometown of Seattle. O'Brien and Powel have a daughter, Neve (born 2003) and a son, Beckett (born 2005).

O'Brien often affirms his Irish Catholic heritage. On a 2009 episode of Inside the Actors Studio, he stated that ancestors from both sides of his family moved to America from Ireland starting in the 1850s, subsequently marrying only other Irish Catholics, and that his lineage is thus 100% Irish Catholic. His entirely homogenous ancestry was confirmed via DNA test a decade later, which he shared on The Late Show with Stephen Colbert. O’Brien noted that being entirely descended from just one ethnic group is extremely rare, and that him being so “shocked” his doctor.

He has been a registered Democrat since casting his first vote for president in 1984 for Walter Mondale. He considers himself a moderate on the political spectrum. O'Brien founded the anti-hunger organization Labels Are For Jars with his friend and former Harvard dormmate Father Paul B. O'Brien. He also helped open the Cor Unum meal center in Lawrence, Massachusetts in 2006.

Starting in September 2006, O'Brien was stalked by Father David Ajemian of the Archdiocese of Boston, who, despite multiple warnings to stop, sent O'Brien letters signed as "your priest stalker". Ajemian later sent O'Brien death threats and tried to forcefully enter a taping of Late Night before being arrested. On April 8, 2008, Ajemian pleaded guilty to stalking, and was later laicized.

In January 2008, after his show was put on hold for two months owing to the strike by the Writers Guild of America, he reemerged on late-night TV sporting a beard, which guest Tom Brokaw described as making him look like "a draft dodger from the Civil War." After leaving The Tonight Show with Conan O'Brien in 2010, O'Brien again grew a beard, which he kept until May 2011, when it was partially shaved on the set of Conan by Will Ferrell (and completely shaved off-screen by a professional barber).

O'Brien purchased a $10.5-million mansion in Brentwood, Los Angeles, California, to prepare for his move there in 2009 from New York City to host The Tonight Show at Universal Studios Hollywood. As part of a long-running gag, he brought his 1992 Ford Taurus SHO with him to California, showcasing it on both the inaugural episodes of The Tonight Show and Conan. O'Brien purchased an ocean-front house in Carpinteria, California in 2016. He listed the house for sale for $16.5-million in July 2022.

On June 12, 2011, O'Brien was awarded an honorary Doctor of Arts degree from Dartmouth College. In addition to the honorary degree, he delivered the commencement speech. On October 21, 2011, O'Brien was ordained as a minister by the Universal Life Church Monastery, allowing him to perform a same-sex marriage while back in New York, then one of the few states in the US where gay marriage was legal, to tape a week's worth of shows. The wedding, between a member of O'Brien's staff and his partner, was held on the stage of the Beacon Theatre on November 3, 2011, and broadcast on Conan''. The same-sex marriage ceremony was the first to be broadcast on American late night television.

Filmography

Film

Television

Video games

Music videos

Awards and nominations

Sources

Notes

References

Further reading

External links 

 
 
 
 

 
1963 births
20th-century American comedians
20th-century American male actors
20th-century American writers
20th-century Roman Catholics
21st-century American comedians
21st-century American male actors
21st-century American writers
21st-century Roman Catholics
American male comedians
American male film actors
American male screenwriters
American male television actors
American male voice actors
American people of Irish descent
American podcasters
American television talk show hosts
American television writers
Brookline High School alumni
Catholics from Massachusetts
Comedians from Massachusetts
The Harvard Lampoon alumni
Harvard University alumni
Irish-American culture in Massachusetts
Late night television talk show hosts
Living people
Male actors from Massachusetts
American male television writers
Massachusetts Democrats
People from Brentwood, Los Angeles
People from Brookline, Massachusetts
Primetime Emmy Award winners
Screenwriters from California
Screenwriters from Massachusetts
Television producers from California
Writers from Massachusetts
Third Man Records artists
Shorty Award winners